The 1988 presidential campaign of Al Gore, U.S. Senator of Tennessee and former House Representative began on April 11, 1987. He campaigned for President of the United States as a Democratic candidate in the 1988 presidential election, against Democratic candidates Joe Biden, Dick Gephardt, Paul Simon, Jesse Jackson, and Michael Dukakis (who eventually won the Democratic nomination). Despite eventual defeat, Gore (with a strong third place) was one of the front-runners that year. Al Gore, at that time, represented the Southern Democrats and some of the Conservative Democrats in 1980s.

Announcement
On April 11, 1987, Senator Gore of Tennessee announced his candidacy. He stated that he believed he could offer, "clearer goals" than the other candidates. 47th Texas Governor, Republican Rick Perry, who at the time was a Democrat, campaigned for Gore during the primaries. During the Democratic debate, Gore argued that his foreign policy platform was different from his rivals, but they disagreed. " 'I reject Gore's efforts to try to pin labels,' Representative Richard A. Gephardt of Missouri told reporters after the event."  At the time of the announcement, Senator Gore was 39 years old, making him the "youngest serious Presidential candidate since John F. Kennedy."
Gore was further described by The New York Times as:

Campaign
According to CNN, Gore ran his campaign as, "a Southern centrist, [who] opposed federal funding for abortion. He favored a moment of silence for prayer in the schools and voted against banning the interstate sale of handguns." In addition, CNN notes, "in 1988, for the first time, 12 Southern states would hold their primaries on the same day, Super Tuesday.

As the only other Southern candidate, Gore chose to criticize Jackson often. Gore began to criticize Jackson for his Mid-East policies. In particular, "Albert Gore Jr. assailed Mr. Jackson's foreign policy views and said he was 'dismayed' by Mr. Jackson's 'embrace of Arafat and Castro'." Jackson responded by stating that, "The issue is not whether the Israelis and Palestinians are moral equivalents. Both of them are human beings and both are trapped in the cycle of death and pain. And they are trapped in the cycle of mutual annihilation. I wanted to offer leadership that will move from mutual annihilation to coexistence to break the cycle of death." Gore was heavily criticized for his attacks against both Jackson and Dukakis. Jackson also retracted some of his previous statements. It was Gore who first mentioned the Massachusetts furlough program Dukakis had supported as Governor by asking him questions in a debate right before the 1988 New York primary, about "weekend passes for convicted criminals"; this later developed into the Willie Horton pro-George H. W. Bush attack ad. However, unlike commonly believed, Gore did not mention Horton by name.

Jackson defeated Gore in the South Carolina Primary, winning, "more than half the total vote, three times that of his closest rival here, Senator Albert Gore Jr. of Tennessee." Gore next placed great hope on Super Tuesday where they split the Southern vote: Jackson winning Alabama, Georgia, Louisiana, Mississippi and Virginia; Gore winning Arkansas, North Carolina, Kentucky, Nevada, Tennessee, and Oklahoma.

Dropping out
Gore was later endorsed by New York Mayor Ed Koch, who made statements in favor of Israel and against Jackson. These statements further cast Gore in a negative light. The endorsement led voters away from Gore who only received 10% of the vote in the New York Primary. Gore then dropped out of the race. The New York Times argued that he lost support due to his attacks against Jackson, Dukakis, and others, as well as for his endorsement by Koch.

Gore was eventually able to mend fences with Jesse Jackson, who supported the Clinton-Gore ticket in 1992 and 1996, and who also campaigned for the Gore-Lieberman ticket during the 2000 presidential election.  According to some, Gore's policies had changed in 2000, reflecting his eight years as Vice President.

Statewide contests won
South: Tennessee, Kentucky, North Carolina, Arkansas, Oklahoma

Outside the South: Nevada, Wyoming

Popular vote position
Dukakis - 9,898,750 (42.51%)
Jackson - 6,788,991 (29.15%)
Gore - 3,185,806 (13.68%)
Gephardt - 1,399,041 (6.01%)
Simon - 1,082,960 (4.65%)

Endorsements

Governors
Governor of Louisiana Buddy Roemer
Governor of North Carolina Jim Hunt

United States Senators
Senator Howell Heflin of Alabama
Senator Terry Sanford of North Carolina
Senator Sam Nunn of Georgia
Senator J. Bennett Johnston of Louisiana
Senator David Boren of Oklahoma
Former Senator Ralph Yarborough of Texas

Lieutenant Governors
Lieutenant Governor of Alabama Jim Folsom, Jr.
Former Lieutenant Governor of Alabama Bill Baxley

State House Speakers
Georgia House of Representatives Speaker Tom Murphy
Alabama House of Representatives Speaker James S. Clark

Others
Mayor of New York Ed Koch
Texas State Representative Rick Perry
Alabama State Senator Ryan DeGraffenried

Notes

External links
The first presidential run - CNN

Presidential campaign, 1988
1988 United States presidential campaigns